This table lists notable alumni affiliated with the Ateneo de Manila University (formerly known as the Escuela Municipal de Manila from 1859 to 1865 and the Ateneo Municipal de Manila from 1865 to 1891), from grade school through graduate and professional schools, during its long history dating back to 1859. The list includes actors, artists, athletes, businesspeople, musicians, politicians, and writers who have attended the university, as well as those who have received honorary degrees.

Legend 
Notes and abbreviations used
 Individuals who may belong in multiple sections appear only in one (their most prominent), with the exception of faculty members who were also alumni.
 An empty class year or school/degree box indicates that the information is unknown or not applicable.
"DNG" indicates the alumnus or alumna attended but did not graduate; year(s) of attendance are included if available.

Schools
GS – Grade School
HS – High School (until 2016)
JHS – Junior High School (since 2016)
SHS – Senior High School (since 2016)
MDM – Municipal de Manila College (1859−1891)
SAS – School of Arts and Sciences (1891−2000)
LS – Loyola Schools (since 2000)
SOH – School of Humanities
SOM – School of Management
SOSE – School of Science and Engineering
SOSS – School of Social Sciences
PS – Professional Schools
Law – School of Law (since 1936)
GSB – Graduate School of Business (since 1960)
SoG – School of Government (since 1996)
SMPH – School of Medicine and Public Health (since 2007)

Art, design and literature

Business

Civil society

Entertainment

Government and politics

Presidents of the Philippines

Vice Presidents, Cabinet members and other executive officials

Governors

Military

Judges

Philippine Congress

Senators

Representatives

Mayors

Other Philippine political figures

Law

Media and communications

Science and technology

Sports

See also
 :Category:Ateneo de Manila University alumni
 List of Ateneo de Manila University faculty

References

Further reading
 Ateneo de Manila University Annual Yearbooks
 Loyola Schools Aegis
 High School Blue Book
 Grade School Chronicle

External links

Official website of the Ateneo Alumni Association 
Official website of the Ateneo de Manila University

People
Ateneo
Ateneo de Manila University